is a passenger railway station located in the city of Kodaira, Tokyo, Japan, operated by the private railway operator Seibu Railway. Located near the border of Kodaira with Higashikurume and Nishitokyo, the station serves passengers from all three municipalities.

Lines
It is located 19.9 kilometers from the terminus of the line at Seibu-Shnjuku.

Station layout
The station consists of one island platform serving two tracks, with an elevated station building above and at a right angle to the platforms.

Platforms

Adjacent stations

History
The station opened on April 16, 1927. Station numbering was introduced on all Seibu Railway lines during fiscal 2012, with Hana-Koganei Station becoming "SS18".

Passenger statistics
In fiscal 2019, the station was the 15th busiest on the Seibu network with an average of 59,220 passengers daily. 

The passenger figures for previous years are as shown below.

Surrounding area
Koganei Park

See also
List of railway stations in Japan

References

External links

Hana-Koganei station information 

Railway stations in Tokyo
Railway stations in Japan opened in 1927
Seibu Shinjuku Line
Koganei, Tokyo